Edward Samuel "Tige" Reynolds (December 11, 1877 – April 26, 1931) was an American cartoonist, most known for his work in the Portland Oregonian, where he worked from 1911 until his death. Born in Oskaloosa, Iowa, he began his newspaper work in California, and eventually worked for the San Francisco Evening Post, Fresno Evening Democrat, Tacoma Ledger, and the Vancouver Province before settling at the Oregonian.

References

External links

Edward Samuel "Tige" Reynolds papers, 1900-1931 at University of Oregon Libraries
Artwork by Edward S. "Tige" Reynolds

1877 births
1931 deaths
American cartoonists
People from Oskaloosa, Iowa
Artists from Portland, Oregon
The Oregonian people